Grammoechus ligatus is a species of beetle in the family Cerambycidae. It was described by Francis Polkinghorne Pascoe in 1888. It is known from Sumatra and Borneo.

References

Pteropliini
Beetles described in 1888